MyMusicStore is the first online music store in the Philippines operated by MobileCash, Inc. and Rising Tide Mobile Entertainment Inc. It is supported by the Philippine Association of the Record Industry (PARI), the trade organization of the recording industry in the Philippines. Aside from Original Pilipino Music (OPM), the site also offers foreign songs.

History
MyMusicStore was launched on January 18, 2012, at the Robot Restaurant and Lounge in Makati Avenue with live performances from the country's top music artists – Pupil, Bamboo and Gary Valenciano, and others.

Piracy
With the support of the Philippine Association of the Record Industry (PARI), MyMusicStore endorses responsible downloading of music to combat piracy and to continuously promote and enliven the music industry.

Partners
Aside from PARI, the store have many partners which are:
 Alpha Music 
 EMI
 Galaxy Records
 GMA Records
 House of Praise 
 House of Tunes
 Indie Pinoy 
 Ivory Music & Video
 MCA Music
 Music Copyright Administrators of the Philippines 
 The Philippine Star
 PolyEast Records
 Sony Music
 Soupstar Entertainment
 Star Records 
 Universal Records
 Viva Records
 Vicor Music

See also
Music of the Philippines

References

External links

Online music stores of the Philippines